Jack Christian is an Australian film and television showrunner, producer, writer and director. He is known most recently for his work on the feature films What Remains of Us, Mercy Road, The Infernal Machine, Run Rabbit Run, Nandor Fodor and the Talking Mongoose, the Netflix series Dive Club, as well as the Thomas Jane crime series, Troppo.

Christian is CEO of film and television production company Filmology, as well as production finance company Filmology Finance. He is on the board of directors of the Australian Academy of Cinema and Television Arts and is a member of the International Academy of Television Arts and Sciences.

In 2020, it was announced that Christian will be producing the upcoming D.J. McPherson thriller, His Name is Jeremiah alongside Ozark creator/producer Mark Williams.

Filmography

References

External links 
 

Television show creators
Showrunners
Australian Academy of Cinema and Television Arts
Australian film producers
Australian screenwriters
Australian film directors
Living people
Year of birth missing (living people)
Place of birth missing (living people)
Members of the Benevolent and Protective Order of Elks